Patrick Joseph Hyland (born 16 September 1983) is an Irish former professional boxer from Dublin. He competed at featherweight and super featherweight.

Professional career
Hyland turned professional in September 2004 in the City West Hotel, Dublin, on an undercard of a bill that included Jim Rock and Peter Buckley. In his debut Hyland beat Birmingham's Dean Ward on points over four rounds.

Irish title
He was the Irish featherweight champion.

Defeating Paul Griffin with 3rd round KO at then National Stadium in Dublin

WBF title
Hyland became the WBF featherweight champion, on 25 June 2011, by defeating France's Philippe Frenois at the National Stadium in Dublin.

Moving to the United States
In September 2011, Hyland moved to New York City to link up with Final Round Promotions. Hyland defeated former Manny Pacquiao and Diego Magdaleno opponent Emmanuel Lucero by unanimous decision, and his next fight took place against experienced veteran Frankie Archuleta in the Mid-Hudson Civic Center, New York, on 5 May 2012, a fight in which he stopped Archuleta in the 4th round. On 8 August 2012, he won a unanimous decision over Carlos Fulgencio in the 8 round main event at Sahlen Stadium in Rochester, New York. This improved his record to 27–0 and set a new Irish record for most consecutive wins ever by an Irish boxer.

WBA interim title shot
On 8 December 2012, Hyland faced fellow unbeaten fighter Javier Fortuna of the Dominican Republic in the MGM Grand, in Las Vegas, Nevada for the interim WBA title on the undercard of Manny Pacquiao vs. Juan Manuel Marquez IV on HBO PPV. In a very competitive fight, the iron-chinned Hyland lost the unanimous decision to Fortuna who seemed to be the busier boxer throughout the bout.

WBC World Title 

Hyland challenged WBC champion Gary Russell Jr on the 16th of April 2016 at Foxwoods Casino as main event on US tv network Showtime. Hyland lost in round 2  Russell’s fast hands to much for Hyland on the night dropping Hyland 3 times in the 2nd round.

Professional boxing record

| style="text-align:center;" colspan="8"|31 Wins (15 Knockouts), 3 Losses, 0 Draws
|-  style="text-align:center; background:#e3e3e3;"
|  style="border-style:none none solid solid; "|Res.
|  style="border-style:none none solid solid; "|Record
|  style="border-style:none none solid solid; "|Opponent
|  style="border-style:none none solid solid; "|Type
|  style="border-style:none none solid solid; "|Round
|  style="border-style:none none solid solid; "|Date
|  style="border-style:none none solid solid; "|Location
|  style="border-style:none none solid solid; "|Notes
|- align=center
|Loss
|31–3
|align=left| Josh Warrington
|
|
|
|align=left|
|
|- align=center
|Loss
|31–2
|align=left| Gary Russell Jr.
|
|
|
|align=left|
|style="text-align:left;"|
|- align=center
|Win
|31–1
|align=left| David Martinez
|
|
|
|align=left|
|
|- align=center
|Win
|30–1
|align=left| Manuel de los Reyes Herrera
|
|
|
|align=left|
|
|- align=center
|Win
|29–1
|align=left| Oszkar Fiko
|
|
|
|align=left|
|
|- align=center
|Win
|28–1
|align=left| Noel Echevarria
|
|
|
|align=left|
|
|- align=center
|Loss
|27–1
|align=left| Javier Fortuna
|
|
|
|align=left|
|style="text-align:left;"|
|- align=center
|Win
|27–0
|align=left| Carlos Fulgencio
|
|
|
|align=left|
|
|- align=center
|Win
|26–0
|align=left| Frankie Archuleta
|
|
|
|align=left|
|
|- align=center
|Win
|25–0
|align=left| Emmanuel Lucero
|
|
|
|align=left|
|
|- align=center
|Win
|24–0
|align=left| Fabrizio Trotta
|
|
|
|align=left|
|
|- align=center
|Win
|23–0
|align=left| Philippe Frenois
|
|
|
|align=left|
|style="text-align:left;"|
|- align=center
|Win
|22–0
|align=left| Daniel Kodjo Sassou
|
|
|
|align=left|
|
|- align=center
|Win
|21–0
|align=left| Suat Laze
|
|
|
|align=left|
|
|- align=center
|Win
|20–0
|align=left| Yordan Vasilev
|
|
|
|align=left|
|
|- align=center
|Win
|19–0
|align=left| Mickey Coveney
|
|
|
|align=left|
|style="text-align:left;"|
|- align=center
|Win
|18–0
|align=left| Manuel Sequera
|
|
|
|align=left|
|
|- align=center
|Win
|17–0
|align=left| Abdul Tebazalwa
|
|
|
|align=left|
|style="text-align:left;"|
|- align=center
|Win
|16–0
|align=left| Carlos Guevera
|
|
|
|align=left|
|style="text-align:left;"|
|- align=center
|Win
|15–0
|align=left| Elvis Luciano Martinez
|
|
|
|align=left|
|
|- align=center
|Win
|14–0
|align=left| John Gicharu
|
|
|
|align=left|
|
|- align=center
|Win
|13–0
|align=left| Geoffrey Munika
|
|
|
|align=left|
|
|- align=center
|Win
|12–0
|align=left| Robin Deaken
|
|
|
|align=left|
|
|- align=center
|Win
|11–0
|align=left| Paul Griffin
|
|
|
|align=left|
|style="text-align:left;"|
|- align=center
|Win
|10–0
|align=left| Mike Dobbs
|
|
|
|align=left|
|
|- align=center
|Win
|9–0
|align=left| Gheorge Ghiompirica
|
|
|
|align=left|
|
|- align=center
|Win
|8–0
|align=left| Roman Rafael
|
|
|
|align=left|
|
|- align=center
|Win
|7–0
|align=left| Lajos Beller
|
|
|
|align=left|
|
|- align=center
|Win
|6–0
|align=left| Tibor Besze
|
|
|
|align=left|
|
|- align=center
|Win
|5–0
|align=left| Craig Morgan
|
|
|
|align=left|
|
|- align=center
|Win
|4–0
|align=left| Imrich Parlagi
|
|
|
|align=left|
|
|- align=center
|Win
|3–0
|align=left| Peter Buckley
|
|
|
|align=left|
|
|- align=center
|Win
|2–0
|align=left| Steve Gethin
|
|
|
|align=left|
|
|- align=center
|Win
|1–0
|align=left| Dean Ward
|
|
|
|align=left|
|style="text-align:left;"|

References

External links
 

Featherweight boxers
Living people
1983 births
Irish male boxers